The Jammu and Kashmir Light Infantry (JAK LI) is an infantry regiment of the Indian Army. The regimental center is in Srinagar's Airport Complex at Awantipora with a winter setup near Jammu. Its regimental insignia consists of a pair of crossed rifles. The regiment mostly consists of volunteers from the state of Jammu & Kashmir and ethnic groups from the state. The Jammu and Kashmir Light Infantry is considered to be one of the most decorated regiment of the Indian army having won 1 Param Veer Chakra and 3 Ashok Chakra. Naib Subedar Chuni Lal of the 8th battalion Jammu and Kashmir Light Infantry is one of the most decorated personnel of the Indian Army.

History
In response to the Pakistani invasion of Kashmir in 1947, local militias were raised for specific sectors, such as Jammu, Leh, Nubra, etc. The militias were a paramilitary force under the Indian Ministry of Home Affairs and operated on the Line of Control. Following the Sino-Indian War of 1962, in 1963 the 7th and 14th Battalions of the J&K Militia were spun off to form the Ladakh Scouts.

The militias conducted themselves with great distinction during the Indo-Pakistan War of 1965 and earned 3 battle honours during the Indo-Pakistan War of 1971. The troopers of the force felt strongly that they wanted the dignity and privileges of a regular army unit, especially keeping in mind their performance and sacrifice in the recent wars. Keeping this in mind, the then head of the J&K Militia, Brigadier Lekhraj Singh Puar of the Garhwal Rifles, who was on deputation to the Ministry of Home Affairs from the Indian Army, prepared and presented plans to the Ministry of Home Affairs for conversion of the militia into regular unit on his own initiative. These efforts bore fruit, and in 1972, the J&K Militia was converted to a full-fledged Army regiment as the Jammu and Kashmir Militia under the Ministry of Defence. Brigadier Puar went on to become the first Colonel of the Regiment. In 1976, the regiment was renamed as the Jammu and Kashmir Light Infantry.

Engagements

The JAK LI has served with honour in numerous theaters.

Siachen Conflict

In 1984, units of the JAK LI were deployed to the Siachen Glacier as part of Operation Meghdoot. The 8th battalion (8 JAK LI) earned great honour by capturing a Pakistani post at 21,000 feet on the Siachen Glacier in 1987. Naib Subedar Bana Singh earned the Param Vir Chakra for the regiment in this battle. He is the first and so far only recipient of the PVC for the regiment. Major (later Brigadier) V.S. Minhas and 2Lt. Rajiv Pande won a Vir Chakra for gallantry displayed during the same engagement.

IPKF and Sri Lanka

In 1987, JAK LI units were deployed to Sri Lanka as part of Operation Pawan.

UN Peacekeeping in Somalia

In 1992–93, the 2nd battalion was deployed as a part of UNOSOM II, the UN Peacekeeping Mission in Somalia.

Kargil War

In 1999, JAK LI earned honours in the Kargil War. The Chief of Army Staff made a special instant award of "Unit Citation" to the 12th battalion for their exceptionally gallant and sterling performance during the battles of Point 5203 on the night of 10/11 June 1999 and Point 4812 on the night of 30 June/1 July 1999 in Batalik. The overall performance of the battalion during Operation Vijay was exceptional and marked with exemplary valour and grit in the face of the enemy.

Units

1st Battalion
2nd Battalion
3rd Battalion
4th Battalion
5th Battalion (Ashok Chakra Paltan)
6th Battalion
8th Battalion (Param Vir Chakra Paltan) (Ashok Chakra Paltan)
9th Battalion
10th Battalion
11th Battalion
12th Battalion
13th Battalion
15th Battalion
16th Battalion
17th Battalion
Others:
161 Infantry Battalion (TA) (H&H) 
162 Infantry Battalion (TA) (H&H) (Ashok Chakra Paltan)
7th Battalion is now 1st Battalion, Ladakh Scouts
14th Battalion is now 2nd Battalion, Ladakh Scouts

Distinctions

Battle Honours
 Laleali, Indo-Pakistani War of 1971
 Picquet 707, Indo-Pakistani War of 1971
 Shingo River Valley, Indo-Pakistani War of 1971
 Gutrian, Indo-Pakistani War of 1971
 Batalik, Indo-Pak War of 1999

Gallantry Awards
The following personnel of the JAK LI, have received the highest honors for gallantry:
 Colonel Manoram Yadav - Sena Medal, 17 JAKLI
 Major Hitesh Kumar Dhankhar - Sena Medal (Gallantry), 10 JAK LI
 Captain Shashi Kant Sharma - Sena Medal (Gallantry) (posthumous), 12 JAK LI, Operation Meghdoot 
 Naib Subedar Bana Singh - Param Vir Chakra, 8 JAK LI, Operation Meghdoot 
 Lieutenant Triveni Singh - Ashoka Chakra (posthumous), 5 JAK LI 
 Captain Keishing Clifford Nongrum - Maha Vir Chakra (posthumous), 12 JAK LI, Kargil War
 Capt Amol Kalia - Vir Chakra (posthumous), 12 JAK LI, Kargil War
 Naib Subedar Chuni Lal - Ashok Chakra (posthumous), Vir Chakra, Sena Medal (Gallantry)
 Brigadier Varinder Singh Minhas - Vir Chakra, Sena Medal, 12 JAK LI
 Second Lieutenant. Rajiv Pande - Vir Chakra
 Major Rohit Sharma - Shaurya Chakra (posthumous), 8 JAK LI,
 Lance Naik Nazir Ahmad Wani -Ashok Chakra (posthumous), Sena Medal and Bar, 162 INF BN (TA) JAK LI

President's Standard
The President , Mr K. R. Narayanan, presented the colours to the regiment at its regimental centre on 9 October 1998.

See also
 Azad Kashmir Regiment
 Jammu and Kashmir Rifles

References

Infantry regiments of the Indian Army from 1947
Military units and formations established in 1976